WKRP in Cincinnati is an American situation comedy television series that features the misadventures of the staff of a struggling fictional radio station in Cincinnati, Ohio. The series was created by Hugh Wilson and originally aired on CBS from September 1978 to April 1982.

Series overview

Episodes

Season 1 (1978–79) 
Producer: Hugh Wilson
Story editors: Tom Chehak, Bill Dial, Blake Hunter

Season 2 (1979–80) 
Executive producer: Hugh Wilson
Producers: Bill Dial, Rod Daniel
Executive story consultant: Blake Hunter
Story editors: Dan Guntzelman, Steve Marshall, Steven Kampmann, Peter Torokvei

Season 3 (1980–81) 
Executive producer: Hugh Wilson
Supervising producer: Rod Daniel
Producers: Blake Hunter, Steven Kampmann, Peter Torokvei
Story consultants: Dan Guntzelman, Steve Marshall
Story editor: Lissa Levin

Season 4 (1981–82) 
Executive producer: Hugh Wilson
Producers: Blake Hunter, Peter Torokvei, Dan Guntzelman, Steve Marshall
Story consultant: Lissa Levin

Special (1980) 
This 11-minute special, a production of the U.S. Treasury Department, uses an abbreviated version of the opening credits of the series (crediting only Gary Sandy and Gordon Jump) but is not a full episode of the series, nor was it televised. It contains no laugh track and is part of a long-running series from the Treasury in which sitcoms were adapted into commercials for Savings Bonds. For reasons unknown, Universal City Studios claimed copyright on the film despite no involvement with the series (and, as a work for hire for the U.S. government, its copyright eligibility is questionable in and of itself).

References

External links
 

WKRP in Cincinnati episodes
Episodes